Perry is a township in the Canadian province of Ontario, located in the Almaguin Highlands region of  Parry Sound District.

The township had a population of 2,454 in the 2016 Canadian census.

Communities
 Clear Lake
 Emsdale
 Novar
 Scotia
 Swindon
 Walls

Demographics 

Mother tongue:
 English as first language: 91.8%
 French as first language: 1.0%
 English and French as first language: 0.5%
 Other as first language: 6.7%

Transportation
The communities of Emsdale and Novar are flag stops on Ontario Northland's intercity motor coach service along its Toronto–Barrie–Bracebridge–Huntsville–North Bay route.

See also
List of townships in Ontario

References

External links

Municipalities in Parry Sound District
Single-tier municipalities in Ontario
Township municipalities in Ontario